Prelude to a Dream is the debut studio album of American singer Jackie Evancho, released on November 10, 2009. Evancho was nine years old when the album was released.  The album consists mainly of covers of classical crossover songs such as Andrea Bocelli's "Con te partirò" and "The Prayer", Josh Groban's "To Where You Are" and Martina McBride's "Concrete Angel", and also included some classical pieces and a rendition of "Amazing Grace", among other selections.

The album was released independently through CD Baby. Nine months later, after Evancho's first performance on America's Got Talent, the album charted in August 2010 on the Billboard 200 at #121 and at #2 on the Billboard Classical Albums chart. Evancho's parents withdrew the album later the same month, however, citing Evancho's vocal progress since its recording.

Track listing  

Notes
 The album originally had 13 tracks. The track "Teaching Angels How to Fly" was added later.

America's Got Talent impact on sales; withdrawal of album
Jason Dowd of The Expressionist magazine gave Prelude to a Dream a glowing review.  Rating the album 5 out of a possible 5, Dowd wrote: 
For the first nine months after its independent release, however, the album "had sold a negligible amount".

On August 10, 2010, Evancho performed on a special YouTube quarter-final edition of the fifth season of America's Got Talent.  She was selected to perform after submitting an audition clip on YouTube of "Panis Angelicus" that received the most viewer votes of any submission.  In her first performance on the show, Evancho sang "O Mio Babbino Caro", receiving a standing ovation, and was awarded a trip to Universal Studios Florida for receiving the most fan votes of all the YouTube submissions to the show.

After this performance, the album debuted in August 2010 on the Billboard 200 chart at #121 and at #2 on the Billboard Classical Albums Chart. It sold 4,000 copies that week (nearly all were digital downloads) and remained on Billboard's Classical Albums chart for four weeks. Nine of the songs on the album charted on Billboard's Classical Digital Songs chart. Evancho's parents withdrew Prelude to a Dream from distribution in late August 2010.  Evancho's father, Mike Evancho, gave the following reason for the withdrawal: "Because the CD was recorded about a year and a half ago and her current voice no longer sounds like what it did then ... we decided to withdraw Prelude to a Dream and will be concentrating on new material as part of her progress."  The CD has become a collector's item, and autographed copies have sold for more than $3,000.

Charts and sales

Chart positions

Sales

References 

2009 debut albums
Jackie Evancho albums
Classical crossover albums
Self-released albums